Yoo Gun-hyung (Hangul: 유건형; born February 14, 1979) is a South Korean recording artist and record producer, best known for his work with PSY, and, in particular, their international hit Gangnam Style.

Biography
Yoo Gun-Hyung was introduced to the world of K-pop in 1996 as one-half (along with Suh Jung-Hwan) of the Korean hip hop duo Untitle. Yoo and Suh were both still in high school, and gained particular recognition in the Korean music industry because they were already writing their own songs. Their second album, entitled The Blue Color was released in 1997. Untitle disbanded in 1999.

Yoo's collaboration with PSY goes back at least to 2006, with Yoo writing music and PSY writing lyrics for songs on the 2006 album PSY – We Are The One. They have also co-written songs for IVY, Kim Jin Pyo, and Ulala Session.

It has also been reported that Yoo and former Untitle co-member Suh have been working with Jang Woo Hyuk (formerly of H.O.T.) on a solo project.

"Gangnam Style", the lead single of PSY 6 (Six Rules), Part 1, which Yoo co-wrote with PSY, was released on July 15, 2012, and the music video was uploaded to YouTube the same day. Within weeks, the video had made it to No. 3 on YouTube's music video list. Then in August, the video went viral outside of the Korean-speaking world, and by September had become the most "liked" video in the history of YouTube.

References

Living people
South Korean musicians
South Korean record producers
South Korean songwriters
1979 births